{{Speciesbox
|taxon = Lomandra hystrix
|image = Lomandra hystrix PA191155 08.jpg
|image2 = Lomandra hystrix PA191155 02.jpg
|authority = Labill.<ref name="WCSP">{{Citation |contribution=Lomandra hystrix|title=World Checklist of Selected Plant Families |publisher=Royal Botanic Gardens, Kew |url=http://apps.kew.org/wcsp/namedetail.do?name_id=280277 |accessdate=2015-01-24}}</ref>
|synonyms = Xerotes hystrix (Labill.) R.Br.
|synonyms_ref=
|}}Lomandra hystrix, commonly known as green mat-rush, or creek mat-rush, is a perennial, rhizomatous herb found throughout eastern Australia. 

History
Lilian Ross Fraser and Joyce Winifred Vickery first described Lomandra hystrix, which they published in Proceedings of the Linnean Society of New South Wales, 62: 286 1937.

Description
The leaves are 80 cm to 100 cm long, and generally have a leaf of about 10 mm to 20 mm wide. It grows beside watercourses in upland and mountain rain forest.

The plant is often used for revegetation and erosion control. The starchy, fleshy bases of the leaves are edible, tasting of raw peas. Even when the roots are exposed it will cling tenaciously in poor soils.

This species is closely related to L. longifolia''; the inner bract and flowers are similar, but it differs in leaf apex, lack of conspicuous marginal sclerenchyma bands on leaves, and in inflorescence branching.

References

hystrix
Asparagales of Australia
Flora of Queensland
Flora of New South Wales
Flora of the Australian Capital Territory
Flora of Victoria (Australia)
Flora of Tasmania
Garden plants of Australia
Plants described in 1805